PP1 may refer to:

 Proton–proton chain reaction
 Protein phosphatase 1
 Constituency PP-1 (Rawalpindi-I)  a Constituency of Provincial Assembly of Punjab
 Ribonuclease PP1

See also
 1-PP
 1PP